Admiral Joseph James "Jocko" Clark, USN (November 12, 1893 – July 13, 1971) was an admiral in the United States Navy, who commanded aircraft carriers during World War II. Born and raised in Indian Territory (which later became part of Oklahoma) and a member of the Cherokee Nation, in 1917 he became the first Native American to graduate from the United States Naval Academy. Clark preferred to be called "J. J." or by the nickname "Jocko" instead of his full name.

Early years
Joseph J. Clark was born to William A. and Lillie Berry Clark in Pryor in the Cherokee Nation, Indian Nation, before it became part of the state of Oklahoma. His father was a member of the Cherokee Nation. Joseph attended Willie Halsell College in Vinita, Oklahoma and the Oklahoma Agricultural and Mechanical College (now named Oklahoma State University) in Stillwater, Oklahoma, prior to being appointed to the U.S. Naval Academy, where he played on the lacrosse and soccer teams.  He was commissioned as Ensign upon graduating in 1917. Clark's nickname, "Jocko", originated at the Naval Academy: on one of his first days there, he was standing in ranks when a classmate called out "The Right Reverend J. Jonathan Jockey Clark!" His wife, Olga Clark, néé Chubarova, was the widow of chess world champion José Raúl Capablanca.

Naval career

World War I and inter-war service
Although Clark was officially a member of the Class of 1918 at the United States Naval Academy, he actually graduated with the class of 1917. He was first posted to the cruiser , which was convoying troops across the Atlantic Ocean. Bulmer was assigned to American Relief Administration and Near East Relief. Clark returned to the US in 1923 and was posted as an instructor at the Naval Academy during 1923–1924. He then went to NAS Pensacola in Florida for flight training and graduated as a naval aviator on March 16, 1925.

Clark served a wide variety of posts throughout the rest of the 1920s and the 1930s. In 1925, he helped Commander John Rodgers prepare for the first West Coast-Hawaii flight in 1925, receiving a letter of commendation for this service. The next year, he was an aide to the Commander, Battleship Division Three, and served as division aviation officer. From 1928 to 1931, Clark was executive officer, NAS Anacostia, in Washington, D.C., and during the next two years was commanding officer of Fighting Squadron Two, attached to the aircraft carrier .

He was the aeronautical member of the Board of Inspection and Survey, Navy Department, from 1933 to July 1936, and during his next tour of sea duty July, 1936 to June, 1937, served as the Lexington's air officer and representative at Fleet Air Detachment, NAS San Diego, California. From July, 1937, to May, 1939, he was executive officer of the Fleet Air Base, Pearl Harbor. He then served as inspector of naval aircraft at the Curtiss Aircraft Corporation, Buffalo, New York.

Clark was then sent to NAS Jacksonville, Florida, as executive officer from December, 1940 until May, 1941. He was in that position when the Japanese attacked Pearl Harbor and returned to his former post with Yorktown in time to participate in raids on the Gilbert and Marshall Islands.

World War II
At the start of U.S. involvement in World War II, Clark was known as an aggressive commander, ready to take his group into battle. He commanded the carrier  in the Atlantic Ocean and off the coast of North Africa, until he was ordered to take command of the newly commissioned . During Clark's command, Yorktown became the setting for the documentary The Fighting Lady, which detailed World War II aircraft carrier operations. In the documentary, Clark is identified only by his nickname of "Jocko" and is voiced by Harry Morgan.

In January 1944, Vice Admiral Marc Mitscher made the Yorktown his flagship. Mitcher was impressed with Clark's seamanship and fighting spirit. In February 1944, Clark was promoted to rear admiral and was transferred temporarily to Task Force 58 while still reporting to Mitscher, who was then commanding the Fast Carrier Task Force, and Admiral Raymond Spruance, commander of the Fifth Fleet. Since all of the task group's command slots were occupied, Clark was assigned to command the new aircraft carrier,  Soon, Mitscher was disappointed with the performance of Rear Admiral Charles Alan Pownall commanding Task Group 3 and replaced him with Clark. He commanded this group in the Marianas campaign, and on multiple occasions his task group was sent north to interdict Japanese aircraft shuttling down from Japan via intermediate islands. His air groups executed air attacks on the shuttle islands of Chichi Jima and Iwo Jima so often that the sailors of the Fast Carrier Task Force nicknamed them the "Jocko Jimas." 

Clark commanded his task group in conjunction with the rest of Task Force 58 in the Battle of the Philippine Sea. His flagship was the carrier Hornet. On the second day of the battle, with his planes returning after sundown, Clark ordered his ships to light up, allowing most planes to land safely.

Korean War
Clark commanded the Fast Carrier Task Force (TF 77) during the Korean War. He was later promoted to vice admiral and rose to command the 7th Fleet before retiring from the Navy on December 1, 1953 with the rank of admiral.

Final years
After retiring from the navy, he lived in New York City, where he was chairman of Hegeman - Harris, Inc., an investment company.

He was made an honorary chief by both the Sioux and Cherokee Nations.

Clark died on July 13, 1971 at the naval hospital in St. Albans, New York. He is buried in Arlington National Cemetery, Section 3, Site 2525-B.

Honors and awards
His many awards and medals include the Navy Cross, Navy Distinguished Service Medal, Silver Star, Legion of Merit with Combat "V", Navy Commendation Medal and the Korean Order of Military Merit. In addition to these most commonly mentioned, he also received the following: Army Distinguished Service Medal for service in Korea, Silver Star Medal, Commendation Ribbon with Combat "V", Army Commendation Ribbon, Ribbon with stars for the Presidential Unit Citation (United States) to the USS Suwanee, USS Yorktown, and USS Hornet; Victory Medals for World War I and for World War II; American Defense Service Medal; European–African–Middle Eastern Campaign Medal (with one star), Asiatic–Pacific Campaign Medal (with twelve service stars) Campaign Medal, the Philippine Liberation Ribbon (one star), Korean Service Medal (one star), United Nations Service Medal, and the National Defense Service Medal.

Clark's flag lieutenant was historian Clark G. Reynolds' uncle. Reynolds was chosen to co-author Clark's autobiography.

Clark was inducted into the Oklahoma Hall of Fame in 1952.

The National Aeronautic Association honored him in 1969 with the Elder Statesman of Aviation Award.

In 1979, the guided-missile frigate  was named in his honor.

Notes

Citations

Bibliography

Further reading
 Carrier admiral by J. J. Clark (1893–1971) with Clark G. Reynolds. (1967)
 On the warpath in the Pacific: Admiral Jocko Clark and the fast carriers, by Clark G. Reynolds (2005)

External links
 Rear Admiral J.J. Jocko Clark – Biography from JackLummus.com

1893 births
1971 deaths
Cherokee Nation people (1794–1907)
Cherokee Nation United States military personnel
People of Indian Territory
Native American United States military personnel
Burials at Arlington National Cemetery
Recipients of the Navy Cross (United States)
Recipients of the Navy Distinguished Service Medal
Recipients of the Silver Star
Recipients of the Legion of Merit
People from Pryor Creek, Oklahoma
United States Naval Academy alumni
Military personnel from Oklahoma
United States Navy admirals
United States Navy World War II admirals
People from Queens, New York
20th-century Native Americans